

The Caudron R.6 was a French reconnaissance aircraft of World War I.  It was a scaled-down version of the Caudron R.4.  It eliminated the R.4's nose-gunner and used smaller engines (Le Rhônes  of 82 kW).  Some 750 of these aircraft were built, three times the production of the original R.4 design.

Operators

Specifications

References
 

1910s French military reconnaissance aircraft
R006